Station Front Metro Mall is an underground shopping center located in Zhongzheng District, Taipei, Taiwan. It is located directly underneath Zhongxiao West Road and is connected with Taipei Main Station.

History
 October 1992: Taipei City Government decided to demolish the Chunghwa Market (中華商場 Zhōnghuá Shāngchǎng).
 Station Front Metro Mall officially started operation on March 15, 2004, allowing 254 tenants of the original Chunghwa Market to open for business there..

Structure

Zhongxiao W. Rd S Exit：

Zhongxiao W. Rd N Exit：

Gallery

See also
 Zhongshan Metro Mall
 Taipei City Mall
 East Metro Mall
 List of shopping malls in Taipei

References

External links

2004 establishments in Taiwan
Semi-subterranean structures
Shopping malls in Taipei
Shopping malls established in 2004
Underground cities in Taipei